The 2011–12 Mississippi Valley State Delta Devils basketball team represented Mississippi Valley State University during the 2011–12 NCAA Division I men's basketball season. The Delta Devils, led by fourth year head coach Sean Woods, played their home games at Harrison HPER Complex and are members of the Southwestern Athletic Conference. The Delta Devils finished the season 21–13, 17–1 in SWAC play to be crowned SWAC regular season champions. They also won the SWAC Basketball tournament to earn the conference's automatic bid into the 2012 NCAA tournament. It was the Delta Devils fifth NCAA Tournament appearance and first since 2008. They lost in the First Four round to WKU.

Roster

Schedule

|-
!colspan=9| Regular season

|-
!colspan=9| 2012 SWAC men's basketball tournament

|-
!colspan=9| 2012 NCAA tournament

References

Mississippi Valley State Delta Devils basketball seasons
Mississippi Valley State
Mississippi Valley State
Mississippi Valley
Mississippi Valley